New York Soundtracks is a remix album of One Step More and You Die by the Japanese band Mono. It was released as a CD in 2004 and in 2009 as part of the special deluxe double LP of 2003 album One Step More and You Die.

Track listing

References

Collaborative albums
2004 remix albums